Lucas Miedler (born 21 June 1996) is an Austrian professional tennis player. 
He has a career-high singles ATP ranking of World No. 201 achieved on 15 October 2018 and a doubles ranking of No. 43 achieved 6 March 2023. He has won three doubles titles on the ATP Tour with compatriot Alexander Erler, at home tournaments in Kitzbühel and in Vienna, and in Acapulco.

Junior Career
He won the boys' doubles at the 2014 Australian Open where he partnered with Australian Bradley Mousley, defeating the French duo of Quentin Halys and Johan-Sébastien Tatlot 6–3, 7–6(7–3).

Professional career

2015: ATP debut
In 2015, Miedler made his ATP World Tour main draw debut by qualifying to the first round of the Vienna Open, where he lost in three sets to Latvian Ernests Gulbis.

2021: Maiden ATP doubles title
At the 2021 Generali Open Kitzbühel, he won the doubles title partnering Alexander Erler.

2022: Second ATP doubles title 
The Austrian team of Erler/Miedler clinched their second and biggest title on home soil at the ATP 500 2022 Erste Bank Open without dropping a set.

2023: Grand Slam debut, Second ATP 500 title
At the Mexican Open he won the title with compatriot partner Alexander Erler defeating en route top seeds Wesley Koolhof and Neal Skupski.

Doubles performance timeline
Current through the 2023 Indian Wells Masters.

ATP career finals

Doubles: 3 (3 titles)

ATP Challenger and ITF Futures/World Tennis Tour finals

Singles: 24 (10–14)

Doubles: 60 (37–23)

References

External links

1996 births
Living people
Austrian male tennis players
Australian Open (tennis) junior champions
Grand Slam (tennis) champions in boys' doubles
People from Tulln an der Donau